American Idol Season 11 Top 10 Highlights is a compilation album released on July 7, 2012. The album was released exclusively through Walmart and contains one cover song from each of the top 10 finalists during season 11 of the television show American Idol. As of July 2012, it has sold 4,000 copies.

Track listing

Charts

References

2012 compilation albums
American Idol albums